Geminin, DNA replication inhibitor, also known as GMNN, is a protein in humans encoded by the GMNN gene. A nuclear protein present in most eukaryotes and highly conserved across species, numerous functions have been elucidated for geminin including roles in metazoan cell cycle, cellular proliferation, cell lineage commitment, and neural differentiation. One example of its function is the inhibition of Cdt1.

History 

Geminin was originally identified as an inhibitor of DNA replication and substrate of the anaphase-promoting complex. Coincidentally, geminin was also shown to expand the neural plate in the developing Xenopus embryo.

Structure 

Geminin is a nuclear protein made up of about 200 amino acids, with a molecular weight of approximately 25 kDa. It contains an atypical leucine zipper coiled-coil domain. It has no known enzymatic activity nor DNA binding motifs.

Function

Cell cycle control 

Geminin is absent during G1 phase and accumulates through S, G2 phase and M phases of the cell cycle. Geminin levels drop at the metaphase-anaphase transition of mitosis when it is degraded by the anaphase-promoting complex.

S phase 

During S phase, geminin is a negative regulator of DNA replication. In many cancer cell lines, inhibition of geminin by RNA interference results in re-replication of portions of the genome, which leads to aneuploidy.  In these cell lines, geminin knockdown leads to markedly slowed growth and apoptosis within several days.  However, the same is not true for primary and immortalized human cell lines, where other mechanisms exists to prevent DNA re-replication.  Since geminin knockdown leads to cell death in many cancer cell lines but not primary cell lines, it has been proposed as a potential therapeutic target for cancer treatment.

Mitosis 

At the start of the S-phase until late mitosis, geminin inhibits the replication factor Cdt1, preventing the assembly of the pre-replication complex. In early G1, the anaphase promoting complex triggers its destruction through ubiquitination.

Geminin, therefore, is an important player in ensuring that exactly one round of replication occurs during each cell cycle.

Developmental control 

Geminin promotes early neural fate commitment by hyperacetylating chromatin. This effect allows neural genes to be accessible for transcription, promoting the expression of these genes. Ultimately, geminin allows cells uncommitted to any particular lineage to acquire neural characteristics.

Geminin has also been shown to interact with the SWI/SNF chromatin remodeling complex. In neural precursor cells, high levels of geminin prevent terminal differentiation. When the interaction between geminin and SWI/SNF is eliminated, geminin's inhibition to this process is eliminated and neural precursors are allowed to differentiate.

Model organisms 

Model organisms have been used in the study of geminin function. A conditional knockout mouse line, called Gmnntm1a(KOMP)Wtsi was generated as part of the International Knockout Mouse Consortium program, a high-throughput mutagenesis project to generate and distribute animal models of disease to interested scientists.

In addition, increased genomic instability and tumorigenesis have been observed in geminin knockout mice in both the colon and lung.

Male and female animals underwent a standardized phenotypic screen to determine the effects of deletion. Twenty-six tests were carried out and three significant abnormalities were observed. A recessive lethal study found no homozygous mutant embryos during gestation, and therefore none survived until weaning. The remaining tests were carried out on heterozygous mutant adult mice and showed that females had abnormal lens morphology and cataracts.

Clinical significance 

Geminin has been found to be overexpressed in several malignancies and cancer cell lines, while there is data demonstrating that geminin acts as a tumor suppressor by safeguarding genome stability.

References

Further reading

External links 
 
 
 

Proteins
Genes mutated in mice